The Journal of Midwifery & Women's Health is a bimonthly peer-reviewed healthcare journal covering midwifery and women's health. It is the official journal of the American College of Nurse-Midwives. It was previously known as Journal of Nurse-Midwifery, and was published by Elsevier.

See also
 Journal of Obstetric, Gynecologic, & Neonatal Nursing
 List of nursing journals

References

External links 
 

Women's health nursing journals
English-language journals
Wiley (publisher) academic journals
Bimonthly journals
Publications established in 1955
Pediatric nursing journals
Academic journals associated with learned and professional societies
1955 establishments in the United States